Ptychotrema usambarense is a species of air-breathing land snail, a terrestrial pulmonate gastropod mollusk in the family Streptaxidae.

This species is endemic to Tanzania.

References

Streptaxidae
Taxonomy articles created by Polbot